William Eldridge may refer to:

 Bill Eldridge, Australian producer
 William W. Eldridge IV, American General District Court Judge for the 26th Judicial District of Virginia
 William Eldridge Brooks (born 1971), American former professional football player and sportswriter covering the National Football League for Sports Illustrated
 William Eldridge "Bill" Frenzel (1928–2014), member of the United States House of Representatives from Minnesota
 William Eldridge Odom (1932–2008), United States Army lieutenant general who served as Director of the National Security Agency under President Ronald Reagan

See also
 William Aldridge 1737–1797), English nonconformist minister